London Buses route 153 is a Transport for London contracted bus route in London, England. Running between Finsbury Park and Liverpool Street station, it is operated by London General.

History 
In July 2017, it was announced that the route would be entirely operated by electric buses by 2019.

From 5 December 2020, the route was extended from Finsbury Square to Liverpool Street station.

In February 2021, the route finally became entirely operated by electric buses following the deployment of 11 Alexander Dennis Enviro200EV bodied single-decker buses from BYD. Around this time, the route also transferred from HCT Group to London General.

Operation
The route is operated from London General's Waterloo bus garage, which has had charging points fitted to accommodate the electric buses. It operates with a frequency of 5 buses per hour during the day and 3 buses per hour during the evening.

References 

Bus routes in London